If I Should Die Before I Wake is a 1946 short story collection by American crime writer Cornell Woolrich under his pseudonym, "William Irish". It contains six short stories.

Story list 
 "If I Should Die Before I Wake"
 "I'll Never Play Detective Again"
 "Change of Murder"
 "A Death is Caused"
 "Two Murders, One Crime"
 "The Man Upstairs"

References

1946 short story collections
Works by Cornell Woolrich
Avon (publisher) books